The CanPacific College of Business and English is a private English Language school, located in Toronto, Ontario in Canada.
, and offers English language programs for international students.

The school offers a variety English programs and services which include: General English, Business English, Bilingual Language Skills, Test preparation (IELTS & TOEIC), University and College Pathway, Night school, and Work Experience program. The School also provides accommodation, activities, medical insurance and Airport services.

History 
CanPacific College of Business and English was founded by Adam Arezo in 1997. The school welcomes students from different countries to study English.

References

Language schools in Canada